Daniel Mutu (born 11 September 1987) is a Romanian footballer who plays for Liga II club FC Brașov.

Honours
Corona Brașov
Liga III: 2020–21
Liga IV: 2019–20

References

External links

Sportspeople from Arad, Romania
Living people
1987 births
Romanian footballers
Association football goalkeepers
Liga I players
Liga II players
CS ACU Arad players
FC Internațional Curtea de Argeș players
FC CFR Timișoara players
CS Pandurii Târgu Jiu players
FC Brașov (1936) players
SR Brașov players
FC Politehnica Iași (2010) players
Sepsi OSK Sfântu Gheorghe players
CSM Corona Brașov footballers
FC Brașov (2021) players